Peter J. Wilhousky (13 July 1902 – 4 January 1978) was an American composer, music educator, and choral conductor of Rusyn descent. During his childhood he was part of New York's Russian Cathedral Boys Choir and gave a performance at the White House to President Woodrow Wilson. He was featured on several broadcasts of classical music with Arturo Toscanini and the NBC Symphony Orchestra, including the historic 1947 broadcast of Verdi's opera Otello.

In 1936, Wilhousky wrote a popular English version of the Ukrainian song "Shchedryk" by Mykola Leontovych and called it "Carol of the Bells". Wilhousky's 1944 choral arrangement of the "Battle Hymn of the Republic" reached #13 on the Billboard Hot 100 in 1959 with the Mormon Tabernacle Choir's Grammy-winning performance, and has become "arguably the most well-known choral arrangement of a hymn or anthem in the United States."

Former students
As a choral director in New York City, he influenced the future careers of musician Julius La Rosa and scientist Stephen Jay Gould.

References

External links
Peter J. Wilhousky (1902–1978), Prominent Carpatho-Rusyns
Wilhousky biography

1902 births
1978 deaths
Musicians from Passaic, New Jersey
American people of Lemko descent
Ukrainian composers
Ukrainian conductors (music)
Male conductors (music)
20th-century conductors (music)
20th-century composers
20th-century male musicians